Ural may refer to the following vessels:

 , a steamship built in Germany in 1890, sold to Russia in 1904, and sunk by the Japanese in 1905
 , Soviet command and control ship launched in 1983 and decommissioned in 2001
 , a Russian nuclear-powered icebreaker launched in 2019

Ship names